Acyperas  is a genus of snout moths in the subfamily Galleriinae. It was described by George Hampson in 1901 and is known from Papua New Guinea and Java, Indonesia.

Species
 Acyperas aurantiacella Hampson in Ragonot, 1901
 Acyperas rubrella (Hampson in Ragonot, 1901)

References

Galleriinae
Pyralidae genera
Taxa named by George Hampson